Blewett was a town in Chelan County, Washington, United States. The small mining town was established on the west side of Peshastin Creek in the foothills of the Wenatchee Mountains in the mid-1870s.  The first mining claims were filed in 1874, and a stamp mill followed by 1878.  A wagon road to Cle Elum was completed in 1879.  The community was originally called Werner with the establishment of a post office in 1893, but the name was changed to Blewett a year later.  It was named after Edward Blewett of Seattle, whose mining company owned many of the claims in the area.  A road to Peshastin was completed in 1896, and a stage ran three days a week.  During this time the town boasted a school, a two-story hotel, stores, a saloon and telegraph service.  The mill ceased operations in 1905 when the main vein of ore ran out.  Not much exists there today, though the Stamp Mill and scattered small buildings are still standing.  A few mines are still accessible, but care must be taken when exploring.

The town may be found near the US-97 roadside marker. There is a parking area and information sign.

References

Geography of Chelan County, Washington
Ghost towns in Washington (state)
Mining communities in Washington (state)
Unincorporated communities in Washington (state)
Wenatchee–East Wenatchee metropolitan area